Anas al-Kandari (1981 – October 8, 2002) was a Kuwaiti citizen. He died in a firefight on Faylaka Island, with United States Marines on October 8, 2002. A U.S. Marine was also killed in the incident as was Al Kandari's fellow fighter Jassem al-Hajiri.

Career
Al Kandari grew up in Salwa, Kuwait.  Stewart Bell, author The Martyr's Oath, reports that his father invested in the Souk Al Manakh, which Bell described as "Kuwait's unofficial stock exchange".  Anas Al Kandari's father made millions, until the stock bubble burst and he went bankrupt.

Al Kandari is reported to have spent 18 months in Afghanistan. He is reported to have returned to Kuwait a few days before al Qaeda's attacks on the U.S. on September 11 attacks.

Al Kandari is reported to have fasted before the attack—which was triggered by recent broadcasts of the dead and wounded in a town in the Gaza Strip that had been bombarded by Israel.

Bell reports that Mohammed Mansour Jabarah, an important source on al Qaeda's operation, stopped cooperating with his interrogators when he learned that his best friend Anas Al Kandari had been killed.
Bell reports that Jabarah had traveled to Afghanistan with Anas Al Kandari in 2000.

References

1981 births
2002 deaths
Deaths by firearm in Kuwait
Kuwaiti Sunni Muslims